Iowa Highway 136 (Iowa 136) is a state highway maintained by the Iowa Department of Transportation. It begins at the Mississippi River in Clinton on the Mark Morris Memorial Bridge, where it continues as Illinois Route 136. It ends at an interchange with U.S. Highway 20 (US 20) and US 52 in Dyersville. Although signed as a north–south highway throughout, the highway runs east to west between Clinton and Oxford Junction, while turning north at Oxford Junction to complete its run to Dyersville. For most of its existence, Iowa 136 connected Clinton and Luxemburg. During the 1950s-1960s, the northern and southern ends of the route shifted slightly because nearby United States highways changed their alignments. The northern end of Iowa 136 shifted again in early 2022.

Route description
Iowa Highway 136 begins on the Mark Morris Memorial Bridge over the Mississippi River at Clinton.  It descends the approach to the bridge and intersects U.S. Highway 67 (US 67), which is running along N. Second Street.  It turns to the north, overlapping US 67 for  until US 67 splits away at N. Third Street.  From US 67, Iowa 136 goes west along Main Avenue and leaves town enters rural Clinton County.  It heads to the north-northwest for  towards Goose Lake along a narrow, curving stretch of road.

Three miles (4.8 km) west of Delmar, it meets U.S. Highway 61 at a diamond interchange. This interchange is adjacent to the 61 Drive In outdoor movie theatre. It continues west through the small communities of Elwood and Lost Nation, before reaching Oxford Junction.

At Oxford Junction, Iowa 136 turns to the north and travels  to Wyoming, where it meets Iowa Highway 64. For one mile (1.6 km), Iowa 64 and Iowa 136 overlap each other through Wyoming. On the western edge of the community, Iowa 136 splits away and travels north towards Onslow.

Now in Dubuque County, Iowa 136 crosses the North Fork Maquoketa River and heads northwest towards Worthington.  Five miles later, it meets U.S. Highway 20 and U.S. Highway 52 at a partial cloverleaf interchange south of Dyersville.  Prior to 2022, US 52 continued with Iowa 136 for toward Luxemburg.

History
In 1926, when Primary Road No. 20 (PR 20) was renamed U.S. Highway 61, Primary Road No. 61, which connected Clinton to US 61 west of Delmar, was renumbered Primary Road No. 136.  In 1930, Iowa Iowa 136 had been extended west and north to what is now Iowa 64, replacing Iowa 153. Iowa 136 extended north to Onslow in 1931, and to Cascade in 1935. In 1938, Iowa 136 had been extended to Luxemburg, replacing Iowa 188. By 1947, only the PR 61 section of road and another section between Wyoming and Oxford Junction had been paved.  In Clinton, Iowa 136 originally began at the N. Third Street intersection with U.S. Highway 67.  After U.S. Highway 30 was rerouted over the Gateway Bridge in 1955, Iowa 136 was extended to cross the Mississippi River over the Lyons-Fulton Bridge.  A year later, an Alternate U.S. Route 30 was designated over the old alignment of US 30 through Clinton, and Iowa 136 was pulled back to its old end.  In 1967, the Alternate US 30 designation was dropped and Iowa 136 again crossed the river.

From 1963 to 1967, U.S. Highway 52 was realigned from Dubuque to Luxemburg to follow U.S. Highway 20 to Dyersville and Iowa 136 to Luxemburg while its original alignment was rebuilt.  During this time, Iowa 136 was truncated back to US 20 at Dyersville, but it was redesignated along this segment after US 52 returned to its old alignment. In December 2021, the Iowa Department of Transportation notified Dubuque county that it was removing the Iowa 136 designation from U.S. 52 between Iowa 3 in Luxemburg and U.S. 20 in Dyersville.

Major intersections

External links

The Iowa Highways Page

References

Transportation in Dubuque County, Iowa
136
Transportation in Clinton County, Iowa
Transportation in Jones County, Iowa